The Rural Municipality of Emerald No. 277 is a rural municipality (RM) in the Canadian province of Saskatchewan within Census Division No. 10 and  Division No. 4.

History 
The RM of Emerald No. 277 incorporated as a rural municipality on December 12, 1910.

Geography

Communities and localities 
The following unincorporated communities are within the RM.

Organized hamlets
 Wishart (dissolved as a village, January 1, 2002)

Localities
 Bankend
 Wynot

Demographics 

Attractions 
 Touchwood Hills Post Provincial Historic Park
 Kellross Heritage Museum
 Kelliher & District Museum
 Foam Lake Marsh

Government 
The RM of Emerald No. 277 is governed by an elected municipal council and an appointed administrator that meets on the second Tuesday of every month. The reeve of the RM is Morris Karakochuk while its administrator is Sharolyn Prisiak. The RM's office is located in Wishart.

Transportation 
 Saskatchewan Highway 35
 Saskatchewan Highway 639
 Saskatchewan Highway 743

See also 
List of rural municipalities in Saskatchewan

References 

E

Division No. 10, Saskatchewan